Peter Lavoy is a scholar and former high ranking U.S. security official. He has served in roles including Assistant Secretary of Defense for Asian and Pacific Security Affairs. He was succeeded by Robin Fontes. Lavoy is the author of Asymmetric Warfare In South Asia.

In 2003 Lavoy was director of the Center for Contemporary Conflict and co-director of the Regional Security Education Program at the Naval Postgraduate School. From June 1998 to June 2000 he served as director for Counterproliferation Policy in the Office of the Secretary of Defense.

References

Year of birth missing (living people)
Living people
United States Department of Defense officials